Bob the Butler is a 2005 family comedy film directed by Gary Sinyor and starring Brooke Shields and Tom Green.

Premise
Bob, a man who can't hold a job, discovers an ad in the Yellow Pages for a butler school. Anne Jamieson, a single mother and neat freak, hires Bob as her butler.

Cast
Tom Green as Bob Tree
Brooke Shields as Anne Jamieson
Genevieve Buechner as Tess Jamieson
Benjamin Smith as Bates Jamieson
Nicole Potvin as Morgan
Rob LaBelle as Jacques
Valerie Tian as Sophie
Simon Callow as Mr. Butler
Iris Graham as Mama Clara

Production
Bob the Butler was originally planned to be released in theaters October 2005 with a presumed PG-13 rating, but instead was aired on the Disney Channel on August 28, 2005, edited down to a PG rating. The film is now available on DVD.

Music
Tom Green performed the credits music "My Name is Bob", which was a track produced by Mike Simpson of The Dust Brothers. The background music for that track ended up being used for Green's 2005 single Teachers Suck from his rap album Prepare For Impact.

References

External links

eFilmcritic.com review

American comedy films
2005 films
2005 comedy films
Films directed by Gary Sinyor
Films set in Washington (state)
Films shot in Vancouver
2000s English-language films
2000s American films